Business for Peace (BfP) is a non-profit foundation based in Oslo, Norway. Each year, the foundation names up to seven Honourees who receive the Oslo Business for Peace Award, in recognition of their individual and business-worthy contribution to the building of trust, stability and peace. The Honourees are selected by an independent committee composed of winners of either the Nobel Peace Prize or Nobel Memorial Prize in Economic Sciences.

The Foundation works worldwide to understand how ethical and responsible business can contribute to building trust, stability and peace. Each year, the Foundation arranges the Oslo Business for Peace Summit, which concludes with the presentation of the Award to that year's Honourees.

Background
The Business for Peace Foundation was established to inspire business leaders and businesses to reconnect with society, to the mutual benefit of both. The Foundation works to demonstrate that business can be a force of mutual good, able to contribute significantly to the building of trust, stability and peace. The Foundation promotes the concept of "being business-worthy", seeking to raise business practices from short-term win-lose dynamics to fulfilling longer-term business aims.

The foundation draws inspiration from the dictum:

The Award Committee of the Business for Peace Foundation selects Honourees who each have demonstrated that it is possible for a business to enter into partnership with society, while remaining profitable and capable of longer-term growth. The goal of the Foundation is to provide its Honourees with a platform from which to share their business wisdom with the world, hoping to inspire other business leaders to emulate their examples.

Kofi A. Annan has stated that "It is important to inspire and encourage businesspersons to be conscious of the role they can play as individuals to foster stability and peace. I think the idea behind the Oslo Business for Peace Award, and the potential impact it may have, is inspiring".

Nominations to the Award
The Business for Peace Foundation works together with nominating partners that help search the world for candidates who embody the values described by the criteria for the Oslo Business for Peace Award.
Beginning in 2009, the Foundation has entered into a formal collaboration with the International Chamber of Commerce, the largest business organisation in the world. Its hundreds of thousands of member companies in 130 countries have interests spanning every sector of private enterprise. The Foundation also works together with Principles for Responsible Investment, the United Nations Development Programme and the United Nations Global Compact, in searching the world for eligible candidates to the award.
The honourees named by the foundation are also able to nominate candidates for the award in subsequent years.

Oddvar Hesjedal serves as secretary of nominations, guiding the nomination process through the year and assisting the award committee in its work.

The Criteria
The Oslo Business for Peace Award aims to highlight ethical and responsible business practices, and the commitment of business leaders as individuals towards creating sustainable long-term success of benefit to their businesses, society and themselves. The independent Award Committee evaluates the Nominees according to three criteria established by the Business for Peace Foundation.

To be considered Business-worthy, and a candidate for the Award, the Nominees must be:

 Examples to Society and their Peers. The Nominees are acting as examples to the general public and inspiring the business community by showing how to achieve success through ethical and responsible practices.
 Advocates of Ethical and Responsible Business. Nominees are outspoken advocates of ethical and responsible business principles, and of social responsibility in corporate governance.
 Trusted by the Communities their Businesses Affect. Nominees have developed and cultivated successful international or national businesses in a manner that is recognized and appreciated by the communities within which their business is active, ideally by creating economic value in a way that also creates value for society.

Being Business-worthy
Being business-worthy is to apply your business energy ethically and responsibly with the purpose of creating economic value that also creates value for society. Being businessworthy embodies tested and true ethical and responsible principles for longer-term business interactions that build trust between the parties involved.
Business deals are sealed with a handshake, and lasting business relationships are created when handshakes are made in good faith between partners intent on creating mutual benefits for one another.
The foundation has coined the word 'business-worthy' to describe the qualities it looks for when searching the world for worthy nominees to the award.

In the spirit of corporate social responsibility, ethically aware businesses build win-win enduring relationships, forging a union between not only the business partners, but also with the societies which are touched by their business activity.
The Business for Peace Foundation seeks to demonstrate that there are legion examples where businesses work as a force of good together with society, achieving results that build trust and contribute to stability and peace. It is the ambition of the foundation that these examples will inform decision makers worldwide, inspiring them to redirect their business activities in accordance with business-worthy principles.

In the January–February 2011 issue of Harvard Business Review, professor Michael E. Porter and Mark R. Cramer proposed what they called Creating Shared Value, while declaring that "Companies must take the lead in bringing business and society back together". Their notion of shared value corresponds well with the criteria of business-worthiness informing the Business for Peace Foundation's search for Honourees.

The Award Committee
Following the nomination process, the Honourees are selected by an independent committee composed of winners of either the Nobel Peace Prize or Nobel Memorial Prize in Economic Sciences.
Present members of the committee are businesswoman Ouided Bouchamaoui, peace activist Leymah Gbowee, professor Finn Kydland and professor Eric S. Maskin. Previous members include human rights advocate and lawyer Shirin Ebadi (2014 – 2018), economist Michael Spence (2009 – 2017), professor Muhammad Yunus (2009 – 2013) and professor Wangari Maathai (2009 – 2011).

The Oslo Business for Peace Award

The statue "the Just Man" has been created by the artist Bruce Naigles, and is presented to the Business for Peace Honourees during the formal award ceremony at Oslo City Hall.
Honourees also receive a diploma noting their exemplary business wisdom.

Business for Peace Honourees

2009
 Anders Dahlvig, Sweden
 Mo Ibrahim, Sudan
 Jeffrey R. Immelt, United States
 Mohammed Jameel, Saudi Arabia
 Jiang Jianqing, China
 Josephine Okot, Uganda
 Zhengrong Shi, China

2010
 Francis Yeoh, Malaysia
 Emily Cummins, United Kingdom
 William Rosenzweig, United States
 Roberto Servitje, Mexico
 Venkataramani Srivathsan, Nigeria
 Ratan Tata, India
 Stef Wertheimer, Israel

2012
 Ibrahim Abouleish, Egypt
 Eduardo Eurnekian, Argentina
 Vladas Lasas, Lithuania
 David W. MacLennan, Canada
 Reginald Mengi, Tanzania
 Latifur Rahman, Bangladesh

2013
 Nadia Al-Sakkaf, Yemen
 Dean Cycon, United States
 Margaret Mussoi L. Groff, Brazil
 Connie Hasemann, Denmark
 Arif Naqvi, Pakistan

2014
 Selima Ahmad, Bangladesh
 Ouided Bouchamaoui, Tunisia
 Sir Richard Branson, United Kingdom
 Kesha Kumari Damini, Nepal
 Adnan Kassar, Lebanon
 Marilyn Carlson Nelson, United States

2015
 Juan Andrés Cano, Colombia
 Merrill Joseph Fernando, Sri Lanka
 Zahi Khouri, Palestine
 Poman Lo, Hong Kong, China
 Paul Polman, Netherlands

2016
 Sarah Beydoun, Lebanon
 Tore Lærdal, Norway
 Dr Jennifer Nkuene Riria, Kenya

2017
 Durreen Shahnaz, Impact Investment Exchange (IIX), Bangladesh & Singapore
 Harley Seyedin, multi-national electricity and low carbon infrastructure development, Iran & United States
 Murad Al-Katib, sustainable agriculture and contributing to feeding millions of refugee families in the Syrian crisis, Canada
 Elon Musk, South Africa & United States

2018
 Lori Blaker, CEO of TTi Global, United States
 Martin Naughton KBE, Founder of GlenDimplex, Ireland
 Edgar Montenegro, Founder and CEO of Corpocampo, Colombia

2019
 Alice Laugher, CEO Committed to Good (CTG), England 
 Hamdi Ulukaya, CEO of Chobani, Turkey & United States
 Agbor Ashumanyi Ako, co-founder of GiftedMom, Cameroon

2020
 James Mwangi, Group Managing Director and Group Chief Executive Officer of the Equity Group Holdings Limited, Kenya
 Marc Benioff, Founder, chairman, and CEO, Salesforce, United States
 Felicitas ‘Joji’ Bautista Pantoja, CEO and Co-Founder of Coffee for Peace, Philippines & Canada

The Oslo Business for Peace Summit
Starting in May 2007, the Oslo Business for Peace Summit has been held annually in the Oslo City Hall. The Summit examines the relationship between ethical and responsible business practices and the promotion of trust, stability and peace. Highly respected statesmen, businesspersons, academics and business thinkers have participated at the Summits through the years.

Summit Themes:

2007 - Peace and Stability through Trade

2008 - Globalisation: the good, the bad and the ugly

2009 - The World in Recession, a call for a more ethically aware capitalism?
At the 2009 Summit, the Natural Resource Charter was presented.

2010 - New Times, the potential of business to contribute to stability and peace

2011 - Business as an Instrument of Peace - Research Symposium in Oslo, in collaboration with the USIP, the Norwegian Ministry of Foreign Affairs and the Peace Research Institute Oslo

2012 - The Essences of Trust in Business Today

2013 - Business in Fragile Environments

2014 - The New Imperative: Creating Shared Value

2015 - How Sustainability can Drive Value Creation

2016 - The Opportunities for Business to Act as a Problem Solver in Society

2017 - Brundtland +30: Breakthrough Ideas for Future-proofing the Global Economy

2018 - Building Trust: Accelerating Climate Leadership

2019 - Navigating in a World of Imbalance

A selection of speakers who have contributed to the Summits: Kjell Magne Bondevik, Alexandra, Countess of Frederiksborg, Roberto Servitje (Grupo Bimbo), Guy F. Tozzoli (World Trade Center), Vijay Kalantri (All India Association of Industries), Jan Egeland, Bob Geldof, Nabil Shaath, Anders Källström, Khater Massaad, Jinghai Zheng, John Lervik, Margaret Beckett, Erik Solheim, Festus G. Mogae, Kandeh Yumkella, Jeremy Rifkin, Anthony J. Venables, Gobind Nankani, Petter Nore, Long Yongtu, Timothy L. Fort, Patricia Aburdene, Juan Carlos Echeverry, Børge Brende, Henrik Syse and Erna Solberg.

References

External links
 LIPEACE - Business for Peace Foundation – Official webpage for LIPEACE LLC
 Business for Peace Foundation – Official webpage for Business for Peace
 Natural Resource Charter

Business organisations based in Norway